1783 Albitskij, provisional designation , is a carbonaceous Adeonian asteroid from the middle region of the asteroid belt, approximately 22 kilometers in diameter. It was discovered on 24 March 1935, by Georgian–Russian astronomer Grigory Neujmin at the Simeiz Observatory on the Crimean peninsula. The asteroid was named after Soviet astronomer Vladimir Albitzky.

Orbit and classification 

Albitskij is a member of the Adeona family, a large family of carbonaceous asteroids, when applying the Hierarchical Clustering Method to its proper orbital elements. It has also been dynamically classified as a member of the Eunomia family (as many other members of the Adeona family), which can be ruled out, due to the fact, that this family consist of stony rather than carbonaceous asteroid.

The asteroid orbits the Sun in the central main belt at a distance of 2.3–3.0 AU once every 4 years and 4 months (1,587 days). Its orbit has an eccentricity of 0.13 and an inclination of 12° with respect to the ecliptic.

The body's observation arc begins one month after its official discovery with the first used observation made at Uccle Observatory in Belgium.

Physical characteristics 

In the SMASS taxonomic scheme, Albitskij is a Ch-subtype, a hydrated C-type asteroid. It has also been characterized as a common carbonaceous C-type by Pan-STARRS photometric survey. This agrees with the overall spectral type of the Adeona family.

Rotation period 

Published by Cláudia Angeli and Maria Barucci, a rotational lightcurve was obtained for this asteroid from photometric observations made at the French Haute-Provence and Pic du Midi observatories by astronomers at Meudon in the early 1990s. It gave a rotation period of 12 hours with a brightness amplitude of 0.4 magnitude.

Diameter and albedo 

According to the surveys carried out by the Infrared Astronomical Satellite IRAS, the Japanese Akari satellite and NASA's Wide-field Infrared Survey Explorer with its subsequent NEOWISE mission, Albitskij measures between 20.47 and 25.6 kilometers in diameter and its surface has an albedo between 0.03 and 0.07.

The Collaborative Asteroid Lightcurve Link agrees with the results obtained by IRAS and derives an albedo of 0.07 and a diameter of 21.3 kilometers, based on an absolute magnitude of 11.85.

Naming 

This minor planet is named after Soviet astronomer, discoverer of minor planets and head of Simeiz Observatory, Vladimir Albitzky (1891–1952). His research included variable stars and the measurement of radial velocities. The official naming citation was published by the Minor Planet Center on 1 June 1980.

References

External links 
 Asteroid Lightcurve Database (LCDB), query form (info )
 Dictionary of Minor Planet Names, Google books
 Asteroids and comets rotation curves, CdR – Observatoire de Genève, Raoul Behrend
 Discovery Circumstances: Numbered Minor Planets (1)-(5000) – Minor Planet Center
 
 

001783
Discoveries by Grigory Neujmin
Named minor planets
001783
19350324